Gaspar Flores (died 1544) was a Roman Catholic prelate who served as Bishop of Salpi (1532–1544) and Auxiliary Bishop of Sigüenza (1533–1537).

Biography
On 13 November 1532, Gaspar Flores was appointed during the papacy of Pope Clement VII as Bishop of Salpi.
In 1533, he was appointed during the papacy of Pope Clement VII as Auxiliary Bishop of Sigüenza.
He served as Auxiliary Bishop of Sigüenza until his resignation in 1537.
He served as Bishop of Salpi until his death in 1544.

References

External links and additional sources
 (for Chronology of Bishops) 
 (for Chronology of Bishops) 

16th-century Roman Catholic bishops in Spain
Bishops appointed by Pope Clement VII
1644 deaths
16th-century Italian Roman Catholic bishops